Teghnit-e Vasat (also Romanized as Teghnīt-e Vasaţ; also known as Ūrtākand) is a village in Chaldoran-e Jonubi Rural District, in the Central District of Chaldoran County, West Azerbaijan Province, Iran. According to the 2006 census, its population is 66, in 12 families.

References 

Populated places in Chaldoran County